The Wisconsin Chamber Orchestra's Concerts on the Square is an outdoor concert series held in each summer Madison on the lawn of the Wisconsin State Capitol. The series consists of six concerts on Wednesday evenings. It has been called "The Biggest Picnic of Summer". 2023 will be its 40th season.

Concerts in the United States
Culture of Madison, Wisconsin
Tourist attractions in Madison, Wisconsin